This is a list of rugby teams in Pakistan, as per the 2017/2018 season.

Division I
 Pakistan Army Rugby Football Club
 Islamabad Jinns Rugby Football Club
 Lahore Rugby Football Club
 Lahore Hawks Rugby Football Club

Division II
 Lodhran Spartans Rugby Football Club
 Desert Camels Bahwalnagar
 Multan
 Police

Division III 
 Shaheen Rugby Football Club
 Dunya Pur
 Vehari
 Kot Addu

Division IV
 FATA
 Khyber Pakhtumkhawa
 Quetta
 Karachi Rugby Football Club

Rugby clubs
Pak